The 2014 Red Bull MotoGP Rookies Cup season was the eighth season of the Red Bull MotoGP Rookies Cup. After pre-season testing at Ciudad del Motor de Aragón, the season began at Jerez on 3 May and ended on 28 September at the Ciudad del Motor de Aragón after 14 races. The races, for the second year contested by the riders on equal KTM 250cc 4-stroke Moto3 bikes, were held at eight meetings on the Grand Prix motorcycle racing calendar.

Spanish riders Jorge Martín and Joan Mir won 9 of the season's 14 races between them – 6 for Martín and 3 for Mir – with Martín prevailing as champion. Martín finished each of the first five races on the podium, including a win at Mugello, and also had a spell of four wins in five races mid-season before clinching the championship in the final meeting. Mir finished as the season's runner-up by just four points ahead of Italy's Stefano Manzi, who took nine podium finishes during the season – including six third place finishes – but only a single victory, at Misano. Other race victories were taken by Soushi Mihara, who won two races, as well as single victories for Toprak Razgatlıoğlu and Bo Bendsneyder; of the trio, Razgatlıoğlu was best placed in the championship, in sixth position.

Calendar

Entry list

Championship standings
Points were awarded to the top fifteen riders, provided the rider finished the race.

References

External links
 
 Season at FIM-Website

Red Bull MotoGP Rookies Cup
Red Bull MotoGP Rookies Cup racing seasons